Victoria Wenonah Banks (born February 8, 1973) is a Nashville-based Canadian singer and songwriter. Her self-produced debut CD When You Can Fly was released on the On Ramp/EMI Canada label in April 2009.  The CD earned Banks a 2010 Canadian Indie Award nomination and six nominations at the 2009 Canadian Country Music Awards (CCMAs) including Album of the Year, Producer of the Year, Single of the Year ("The Wheel"), Songwriter of the Year ("The Wheel"), Female Artist of the Year and Rising Star, making Banks  the most nominated female artist of 2009. "The Wheel," the album's first single, reached the Top 20 on the Radio & Records Country Singles chart earning her a 2010 Canadian Radio Music Award nomination. Music videos for "The Wheel" and "When You Can Fly" received airplay on CMT Canada.

Banks was named both Female Artist of the Year and Songwriter(s)Of The Year at the 2010 CCMA Awards, and was nominated in the Female Artist of the Year category again in 2011.

Banks has penned songs for a variety of artists including Sara Evans, Jessica Simpson, Lauren Alaina, Carly Pearce and Mickey Guyton.  In 2020 she became a podcast host with "The Table Women", a series that focuses on women in the entertainment industry.

In the fall of 2021, Banks joined the faculty of Belmont University's Mike Curb College of Entertainment and Music Business as an instructor of songwriting.

Music career 
Banks and Canadian country artist Deric Ruttan both went to high school in Bracebridge, Ontario where they performed in a band together.  She went on to complete a degree in Zoology/Anthropology at the University of Toronto before moving to Nashville, Tennessee in 1998, where she signed her first publishing deal.  From 1998-2002 she was a staff songwriter for Fame Music (aka House of Fame), from 2002-2007 she was a writer for Full Circle Music (Circle C Songs), from 2008-2010 she wrote for Nashville's Sony/ATV Publishing, from 2011-2013 for Chrysalis Music (subsequently BMG Chrysalis), and from 2013-2019 for Nashville's RareSpark Media Group.

As a staff songwriter in the country music market, Banks has had songs featured in movies and TV and recorded by a variety of country artists including Jessica Simpson, Sara Evans, Carly Pearce, Cassadee Pope, Mickey Guyton, One More Girl,  Johnny Reid, and Doc Walker. She has won International Unisong and USA Songwriting Competitions in 2006 and 2007, played acoustic guitar for Pam Tillis, Crystal Shawanda and Rachel Proctor, shared the performing stage with Julie Roberts, Jamie O'Neal, Alabama and Billy Currington, and has toured as an opener for Reba McEntire, Wynonna Judd, Randy Travis, and Lonestar. She co-wrote the top Canadian country singles of 2009: Johnny Reid's "Dance With Me" and One More Girl's "When it Ain't Raining".  Her Jessica Simpson hit "Come on Over" was the highest debuting first single for a new country artist in the Billboard chart history and earned a 2009 ASCAP Country Music Award, and her solo-written Sara Evans hit "Saints & Angels" earned her a 2003 ASCAP Country Music Award and a SOCAN International Achievement Award.

In May 2010, after completing a tour in Canada, Banks penned the song City Of Dreams while traveling back home to the devastating and historic Nashville flood. Her song came to life in a video, when two weeks later, over 40 Nashville artists and musicians, from legendary voices to new faces, joined forces with a production/engineering team and film crew to record it as a  flood relief song. This single was released as a digitally download. All participants and facilities donated their services and all proceeds from the song and music video City Of Dream-Artists for Tennessee Flood Relief will benefit the American Red Cross.  The Nashville Ballet subsequently choreographed "City of Dreams" along with several of Victoria's songs and performed them alongside her as part of their 2016 Attitude program at the Tennessee Performing Arts Center.

Victoria has had songwriting success in Australia in 2019 with multi-week #1 "Flamethrower" recorded by Christie Lamb, and again in 2019 with two #1 singles released back-to-back by Amber Lawrence ("Heart" and "Hell to Hallelujah").

Banks presented "That's a Country Song" to the country duo Florida Georgia Line on NBC's Songland on May 18, 2020 to an enthusiastic reception from panelist songwriter Shane McAnally, who called her "the real deal".

In February 2020, Capitol Records Nashville artist Mickey Guyton debuted the single "What Are You Gonna Tell Her?" (co-written by Guyton and Banks with Emma-Lee and producer Karen Kosowski) to a standing ovation of country radio programmers during the Universal Music Group Country Radio Seminar event at Nashville's Ryman Auditorium. In September 2020, Guyton performed the song on the Academy of Country Music Awards with Keith Urban accompanying on piano, making history as the first Black woman to perform an original song on the awards show. A special display about the song - including text messages from Banks' phone on the day of the song's conception - was featured in a 2021 exhibit in Nashville's Country Music Hall of Fame.

Guyton's subsequent EP, "Bridges", included 3 songs co-written by Banks. Guyton followed up with a 2021 ACM Awards performance of the Banks co-written "Hold On", backed up by the Belmont University choir. Guyton's 2021 release of the full-length album "Remember Her Name" includes 4 songs co-written by Banks.

Victoria's "Uncovered" album, for which she wrote, engineered, produced, and played all instruments on every track (except for a guest appearance by fiddle player Larry Franklin), was released in May 2020.  It includes 9 songs, 8 of which have previously been recorded by other artists.

Discography

Studio albums

Singles

Guest singles

Music videos

Singles written by Banks

Awards and nominations
In 2003, Banks was the recipient of an International Achievement Award for the song "Saints and Angels" at the SOCAN Awards in Toronto. In 2009 Victoria was the most nominated female artist in Canadian Country music at the Canadian Country Music Association awards.
She was also nominated for a 2009 Canadian Radio Music Award for Country Song of the Year for her  breakout single The Wheel and nominated for a 2009 Indie Award for Independent Country Artist of the Year.
On September 11, 2010 in Edmonton, Alberta at the Canadian Country Music Association Gala Dinner it was announced that Banks was one of the recipients of the Songwriter(s) Of The Year for the song Dance With Me (written by Victoria Banks/Johnny Reid/Tia Sillers; recorded by Johnny Reid). The following day Sunday September 12, 2010 at Edmonton's Rexall Place, she was presented with the Female Artist of the Year award, broadcast on CBC Television and CMT Canada.

References

External links
Victoria Banks official site

Living people
306 Records artists
Canadian women country singers
Canadian country singer-songwriters
1973 births
Canadian Country Music Association Female Artist of the Year winners
21st-century Canadian women singers